Susan Dew Hoff (Dew; November 24, 1842 – January 2, 1933) was the first woman licensed to practice medicine in West Virginia.

Career
Susan Matilda Dew was born on November 24, 1842, in Hampshire County, West Virginia to parents William Henry Harrison Dew and Jane Davis Dew. Growing up, she assisted her father with his medical practice and once he died, she inherited his medical library. She married James Hoff in 1869 and they had five children together before she chose to pursue a career in medicine. Although her husband was discouraging, she decided to continue studying.

When Dew Hoff approached the State Board for a license to become a practicing physician, she was told: "we will make no difference on account of sex or physician." To prepare herself for the State Board Examinations, Dew Hoff studied the medical books from her father's library. She traveled to Wheeling, West Virginia to take the exam, which lasted a day and a half and included both written and oral segments. Following the exam on April 19, 1889, she was informed she was the first woman to pass the examination and yielded the best examinations of anyone who had taken the tests. Dew Hoff returned to her home in West Milford without the intention of opening her father's office, but she was approached by her father's former patients due to her reputation as his assistant. When Dew Hoff began practicing medicine, she made house calls on horseback, charging $1 for each call plus $1 per mile. The charge for delivering a baby was $5 plus travel expenses.

Following her death on January 2, 1933, a free health clinic in West Milford was named the Susan Dew Hoff Memorial Clinic in her honor.

References

1842 births
1933 deaths
People from Hampshire County, West Virginia
20th-century American women physicians
20th-century American physicians
19th-century American women physicians
19th-century American physicians